Nicolò Grassi (7 April 1682 – 6 October 1748), also known as Nicola Grassi, was an Italian painter, active in a late-Baroque or Rococo style.

Biography
He was born in Formeaso in the Friuli and died in Venice.

After studying as an apprentice with Antonio Carneo he moved to Venice in 1697 after his death. He worked with the Genovese artist Nicolo Cassana until 1709.

In 1710 he was recognized for his work The Virgin with Child and two saints. Between 1722 and 1725 he went to Bavaria and then to Dalmatia.

Sources
 Aldo Rizzi, The Masters of Venetian Painting Electa, Milan 1973.
 Translated from Italian Wikipedia entry

1682 births
1748 deaths
17th-century Italian painters
Italian male painters
18th-century Italian painters
Italian Baroque painters
18th-century Italian male artists